Walter Müller (16 April 1940 – 10 June 1966) was an Austrian biathlete. He competed in the 20 km individual event at the 1964 Winter Olympics.

References

1940 births
1966 deaths
Austrian male biathletes
Olympic biathletes of Austria
Biathletes at the 1964 Winter Olympics
Sportspeople from Innsbruck